The 2013–14 Belgian Hockey League season was the 94th season of the Belgian Hockey League, the top level of ice hockey in Belgium. Seven teams participated in the league, and the Bulldogs Liège won the championship.

Regular season

Playoffs

External links
 Royal Belgian Ice Hockey Federation

Bel